Gustav Victor Lachmann (3 February 1896 – 30 May 1966) was a German aeronautical engineer who spent most of his professional life working for the British aircraft company Handley Page. He was, with Frederick Handley Page, the co-inventor of the leading edge slot.

Lachmann was born in Dresden, Germany, in 1896, the younger son of Gustav Anton Lachmann, an Austrian industrialist, and his wife, Leopoldine Wilvonseder.  He served as a lieutenant in the German Army cavalry during World War I before transferring to the flying corps in 1917 and training as a pilot. During flight training he stalled and crashed, breaking his jaw.

While hospitalised, he turned his mind to the cause of his crash. He concluded that a series of small aerofoils contained within a normal wing section would possess improved low-speed characteristics. He rigged up a primitive flow-visualisation rig using a fan and cigarette smoke to confirm his ideas. He attempted to patent the principle, but the application was initially rejected by the German Patent Office on the basis that there was no proof that it would work. Lachman gave up the idea and enrolled at Darmstadt Technical University, for a course in mechanical engineering and aerodynamics. He graduated in June 1921 and took a job with the Opel factory.

By chance, he read an account of Frederick Handley Page's  public demonstration of leading-edge slots given at Cricklewood on 21 October 1921. This encouraged him to renew his patent application. He borrowed DM 1000 from his mother to pay for wind-tunnel tests, to be undertaken by Ludwig Prandtl at Göttingen University and the patent was retrospectively granted as DE 347884. This gave his patent priority over those of Handley Page, but a meeting between the two men settled the matter to mutual advantage, the patent rights being shared, and Lachmann being hired as a consultant by Handley Page Ltd.

In 1923, his doctoral thesis The Slotted Wing and its Importance for Aviation was accepted by Aachen Technical University. He then spent time as a designer at the Schneider aircraft works in Berlin before becoming chief designer at the Albatros aircraft works at Johannisthal in 1925, where he designed the Albatros L 72  and the twin-engined Albatros L 73 eight-passenger transport.

In 1926, Lachmann resigned from Albatros to join the Ishikawajima Aircraft Works in Tokyo as a technical adviser. He left Ishikawajima in 1929 to take a job with Handley Page in the United Kingdom as engineer in charge of slot development. In 1932, he was appointed chief designer, designing the H.P 54 Harrow and Hampden aircraft. In 1936, he was appointed to set up a special research department to work on a tailless aircraft design, the Handley Page H.P.75.

Lachmann was regarded with suspicion by the British counter-intelligence service MI5 as a possible spy. On the outbreak of World War II, Lachmann was sent to Quebec on the Duchess of York as an enemy alien and also interned on the Isle of Man, but, after pressure from his employers, he was eventually permitted by the authorities to continue his work for Handley-Page in  Lingfield Prison.

In 1949, he became a British citizen. He stayed with Handley-Page for the remainder of his career, eventually becoming head of research, until 5 months before his death at Chorleywood, Hertfordshire, in 1966.

References

External links
 NACA translation of the Lachmann's German paper about the slat, year 1921
 History of the invention of the slotted or slatted wing

1896 births
1996 deaths
German aerospace engineers
German emigrants to the United Kingdom
German Army personnel of World War I
German people of Austrian descent
Handley Page
Engineers from Dresden
People from the Kingdom of Saxony
People interned in the Isle of Man during World War II
Naturalised citizens of the United Kingdom
People from Chorleywood
Luftstreitkräfte personnel